Wang Xinkang (born 28 January 2004) is a Chinese ice dancer. Along with partner Li Xuantong, he is the 2022 Chinese National Championships silver medalist.

Career (With Li)

Junior career

2022–23 season 
Wang competed in the junior division of the 2022 Santa Claus cup, finishing in 4th place with a score of 134.45. Later in the Chinese junior figure skating championships, Li/Wang ranked second, after losing to Jilin pair Lin Yufei/Gao Zijian. He and Li participated in the 2023 Junior worlds championships, where they placed 22nd after the Rhythm Dance and did not qualify for the Free Dance.

Senior career

2022–23 season 
Wang competed in the senior division of the 2022 Santa Claus cup, and finished in 7th place with a score of 148.09. He and Li won the 2nd place at the 2022 Chinese Championships, after losing to another Harbin pair by 6.65 marks. Wang/Li are assigned to compete in the 2022/23 Chinese Figure Skating Champions Championships, which is scheduled to be held in Qingdao from 12–13 April 2023.

Programs

Competitive highlights 
With Li

Detailed results
Small medals for short program and free skating are awarded only at ISU Championships. At team events, medals are awarded for team results only. ISU personal bests are highlighted in bold.

Senior level

Junior level

References

Living people
2004 births
Chinese male ice dancers
21st-century Chinese people